Herbert Sutcliffe made his first-class debut for Yorkshire in the 1919 season, during which he and Percy Holmes developed one of county cricket's greatest opening partnerships. After initial success, Sutcliffe had a couple of relatively lean seasons before fulfilling his promise in 1922. In 1924, he made his debut for England in Test cricket and formed a famous Test opening partnership with Jack Hobbs. He enjoyed personal success on the 1924–25 MCC tour of Australia, although England lost the Test series 4–1 to Australia. In the 1926 Ashes series against Australia, Hobbs and Sutcliffe produced a series-winning partnership at The Oval in difficult batting conditions. By the end of the 1927 season, Sutcliffe was one of the world's premier cricketers and was being considered, although he was a professional, for the captaincy of Yorkshire.

1919: debut season
Sutcliffe joined Yorkshire at the age of 17 in 1912 and had represented the club's 2nd XI but the First World War delayed the start of his first-class career. He was 24 when his chance finally came. In May 1919, he played for the county's 2nd XI against a full-strength 1st XI and did very well, scoring 51 not out. He received a good report in the Yorkshire Post and never played for the 2nd XI again.

Yorkshire's first County Championship fixture after the war took place on 26 and 27 May at Bristol against Gloucestershire and Sutcliffe, batting at number 6, made his first-class debut. 1919 was the season when two-day games were tried in the championship but were soon perceived to be a failure. Yorkshire batted first, after losing the toss, and Sutcliffe made 11 in a total of 277 (Roy Kilner 112). Despite that seemingly modest score, Yorkshire won by an innings and 63 runs as Gloucestershire were bowled out twice for 125 and 89.

Sutcliffe's next match was his first at Lord's when Yorkshire played MCC in a 3-day match from 29 to 31 May. He did well in the 1st innings, scoring 38 in a total of only 120 but made just 3 in the 2nd innings. The match was drawn. Sutcliffe followed this with his first half-century when he made 67 not out against Cambridge University at Fenner's in a drawn two-day match on 2 and 3 June.

After a drawn game against Essex at Leyton, Yorkshire went to Old Trafford for the first post-war Roses Match against Lancashire, Sutcliffe's first appearance in the fixture. Yorkshire were outplayed and lost by 140 runs but Sutcliffe earned a lot of plaudits with a defiant 2nd innings score of 53 in an all-out total of 153.

Sutcliffe continued to make progress, notably with a new highest score of 71 against Derbyshire, but he was still batting in the middle order. Veteran Wilfred Rhodes was still opening the innings for Yorkshire alongside Percy Holmes, who had played a few pre-war matches. Finally, in the match against Nottinghamshire at Bramall Lane on 27 and 28 June, Rhodes decided to drop down the order for the 2nd innings and Sutcliffe went in first with Holmes.

Sutcliffe had a run of indifferent scores after he began to open the innings but finally everything fell into place when Yorkshire played Northamptonshire on 23 and 24 July at Northampton. Yorkshire won the toss and then won the match by an innings and 196 runs. Sutcliffe and Holmes put on 279 for the first wicket with Sutcliffe scoring 145 and Holmes 133. In both cases, it was their highest score to date and Sutcliffe more than doubled his, hitting 21 fours and 1 six in the process.

Having scored his maiden century, Sutcliffe immediately made another in the return match against Gloucestershire. But he really came of age and made the grade when he scored 132 against Lancashire at Bramall Lane on 4 and 5 August, sharing another big partnership with Holmes of 253. Holmes made 123. However, the match was drawn.

Holmes and Sutcliffe were both awarded their county caps in August 1919. Sutcliffe created a debut season record by scoring 1,839 runs at an average of 44.85 with 5 centuries and a highest score of 174 against Kent at Crabble Athletic Ground in Dover. Holmes did equally well by scoring 1,886 runs at an average of 43.86 with 5 centuries and a highest score of 140. Holmes and Sutcliffe scored 5 centuries each in 1919 and they shared in 5 century partnerships. Their performances were key to Yorkshire winning the championship that season for the 10th time in all.

Yorkshire had been hit by a double tragedy in recent years with the deaths of Alonzo Drake (illness) and Major Booth (killed in action during the war) and a rebuilding process was necessary. The success of Holmes and Sutcliffe went a long way towards completing that process. Otherwise, Yorkshire relied mainly on their Edwardian veterans George Herbert Hirst, Wilfred Rhodes, David Denton and wicket-keeper Arthur Dolphin. As always in the era of Lord Hawke, now club president, the team captain was an amateur player and from 1919 to 1921 it was Cecil Burton who filled the role. Other mainstays of the team that Sutcliffe joined were pace bowler Abe Waddington, all-rounder Roy Kilner and seam bowler Emmott Robinson. But it was not a settled team and Yorkshire used a total of 21 players in the 1919 County Championship.

As a result of their success in 1919, Percy Holmes and Herbert Sutcliffe were both awarded a Wisden Cricketer of the Year title in 1920. In the accompanying review, Wisden commented on Sutcliffe's pre-war development and the benefits that both he and Holmes derived from Doughty's coaching. Sutcliffe's "fine driving" was commended but it was noted that "he may not yet be quite so strong in defence".

1920 English cricket season
Middlesex won the championship in both 1920 and 1921, while Yorkshire finished 4th and 3rd respectively. By his 1919 standards, Sutcliffe personally had two quieter years also.

In the 1920 season, he was well down the national averages with 1,393 runs at 33.16 with 4 centuries and a highest score of 131. Holmes in comparison had an outstanding season, scoring 2,254 runs at 50.08 with 7 centuries and a highest score of 302 not out. Holmes and Sutcliffe both made their highest score in August at the United Services Recreation Ground in Portsmouth against Hampshire when they shared 347 for the first wicket, Yorkshire winning by an innings and 235 runs.

Yorkshire's transition continued and 1920 saw the debuts of future Test players George Macaulay and Maurice Leyland. George Hirst played fewer matches than in 1919 as he began to fade from the scene. Meanwhile, Norman Kilner, brother of Roy, became a first team regular.

1921 English cricket season

In 1921, Sutcliffe did not score a century and made 1,235 runs at 30.12 while Holmes, who was picked for England this year, made 1,577 runs at 38.46.

Yorkshire could be well satisfied with their third-place finish in the County Championship as the team was still in transition. The retirement of David Denton brought Edgar Oldroyd fully into the picture and Arthur Dolphin played less matches than previously as Reg Allen became the favoured wicket-keeper for a time. Norman Kilner ceased to be a regular and eventually joined Warwickshire. Macaulay, Sutcliffe's future business partner, was now the first choice opening bowler. Sutcliffe was one of six Yorkshire batsmen who scored 1,000 runs in the championship.

1922 English cricket season
In 1922, as Yorkshire regained the championship title under new captain Geoffrey Wilson, Sutcliffe lived up to his early promise by scoring 2,020 runs at 46.97 with a highest score of 232 against Surrey at The Oval. He scored 11 half-centuries but only 2 centuries.

Sutcliffe's performance against Surrey was the highlight of his career to date. He passed his previous highest score of 174, made in 1919, and he proved beyond doubt his ability to be the mainstay of an innings as Yorkshire made 539 for 5 declared and he shared in two century partnerships with Oldroyd and Roy Kilner. The match was eventually drawn.

Yorkshire by now did have a settled side and used only 16 players in the County Championship. Sutcliffe was one of seven players who were ever-present, playing in all 30 matches. The others were Holmes, Roy Kilner, Oldroyd, Rhodes, Robinson and Waddington. Macaulay missed only one match and Dolphin two. Leyland continued his development, making 12 appearances, and Arthur Mitchell made his debut.

1923 English cricket season
Sutcliffe's career advanced in 1923 when he made his first appearances in the North v South and Gentlemen v Players fixtures and in a Test Trial match. He scored 53 and 0 for the North in a match at Old Trafford which the South won by 38 runs. Making his debut for the Players at Lord's, he scored 3 and 78 not out in a drawn match in which he and Jack Hobbs opened together for the second time. In the Test Trial, playing for England v The Rest, Sutcliffe again opened with Hobbs and they put on 86 and 10 in their two partnerships, Sutcliffe scoring 65 and 7 as England won by 5 wickets.

Sutcliffe's overall record in 1923 was 2,220 runs at 41.11 with 3 centuries, 15 fifties and a highest score of 139 against Somerset. Holmes also topped 2,000 runs in the season and shared in 9 century stands with Sutcliffe, taking their overall tally to 25 and beating the record of 19 set by John Tunnicliffe and Jack Brown from 1895 to 1903. The Yorkshire cricket historian Alfred Pullin wrote: "it was recognised long before the season ended that Sutcliffe had established his claim to be considered one of England's first-wicket batsmen".

Yorkshire won the County Championship for the second successive season but in emphatic style as they won 25 out of 32 matches, 10 wins more than anyone else, and 13 of the victories were by an innings. Six batsmen (Sutcliffe, Holmes, Leyland, Kilner, Oldroyd and Rhodes) scored more than 1,000 runs in the championship. Macaulay, Kilner and Rhodes took over 100 wickets and Robinson took 95.

1924 English cricket season
In the 1924 season, Yorkshire completed a hat-trick of championships under Geoffrey Wilson and Sutcliffe enjoyed probably his best season to date, scoring 2,142 runs at 48.68 with 6 centuries including a highest score of 255 not out against Essex.

Herbert Sutcliffe made his Test debut on Saturday, 14 June 1924, playing for England against South Africa at Edgbaston and opening the innings with Jack Hobbs. In this First Test, which England won by an innings, they recorded their first century partnership for England by putting on 136 before Sutcliffe was out for 64. Wisden said of his debut:

Sutcliffe's first appearance in a Test match was nothing less than a triumph. Bowled by a yorker just after luncheon, he played flawless cricket, being especially strong on the leg side.

In the Second Test at Lord's, Hobbs and Sutcliffe scored 268 before Sutcliffe was out for 122; Hobbs went on to make 211 and England again won by an innings. In the whole series, Sutcliffe scored 303 runs at 75.75.

Yorkshire faced a strong challenge from Middlesex for the County Championship and it was only because of two Middlesex defeats in the last fortnight of the season that they were able to take the title in the end. Apart from representative calls, Yorkshire fielded almost the same eleven players throughout the season: Sutcliffe, Holmes, Leyland, Oldroyd, Kilner, Rhodes, Robinson, Wilson, Macaulay, Dolphin, Waddington.

1924–25 MCC tour of Australia

As early as July, Sutcliffe was one of ten players named who would tour Australia in the winter of 1924–25 under the leadership of Arthur Gilligan. The fee for this tour was £400 plus bonuses awarded on merit and additional expenses allowed of £1 10s per week on the sea voyages and £2 per week in Australia. Hobbs, however, declined the invitation because he was reluctant to leave his family and his sports goods business for several months. But, after approaches were made to entice him onto a short private tour of South Africa, with his wife also invited, it became apparent that Hobbs might be willing to go to Australia if his wife could accompany him. This was duly arranged, although Hobbs typically insisted on going as an "extra team member" so that none of those already selected would lose their place. The importance of this to Sutcliffe was that his partnership with Hobbs could continue at the very highest level of cricket where the presence of Hobbs was ultimately the key factor in Sutcliffe's major success on the tour, which established him as a world-class player.

When Sutcliffe arrived in Australia he had some initial difficulty in adjusting to the conditions, specifically the strong light which affected his timing. He also reckoned that the pitches were a good four yards faster than in England. His remedy was to play straight and by hitting the ball back down the pitch. He said later that he sacrificed many of his best shots, but "it paid off in the end". He had certainly adjusted in time for the First Test against Australia at Sydney Cricket Ground, a "timeless" match played from 19 to 27 December. Australia's main bowlers in the series were Jack Gregory, Charles Kelleway and Arthur Mailey, while Clarrie Grimmett made his Test debut in the final match. Hobbs and Sutcliffe twice made century partnerships in the First Test, which Australia won by 193 runs, with stands of 157 and 110. Sutcliffe's own scores were 59 and 115.

In the Second Test at Melbourne Cricket Ground, Hobbs and Sutcliffe shared 283 in the first innings and Sutcliffe scored two centuries in the match with 176 and 127. He was the first player to score hundreds in both innings against Australia, but he was unable to prevent Australia winning by 81 runs. The stand of 283 was in response to a massive Australian total of 600 and it drew enormous praise with Monty Noble, for example, describing it as "English cricket at its best". Noble pointed out that a huge mental as well as physical effort was needed to overcome the hopelessness of the England task. Sutcliffe rated it as the second best partnership of his career, beaten only by the "sticky wicket" stand at The Oval in 1926.

After England lost by just 11 runs in an exciting Third Test at Adelaide Oval (Sutcliffe 33 and 59), they finally defeated Australia in the Fourth Test at Melbourne for the first time since 1912. Sutcliffe made 143, his 4th century of the series, after sharing in yet another century stand with Hobbs. England won by an innings and 29 runs. In the final Test at Sydney, England were completely undone by Grimmett who took 11 wickets on debut. Sutcliffe scored 22 and 0, Hobbs scored 0 and 13; England lost by 307 runs.

Although England lost the series 4–1, they were much closer to Australia than they had been since the war and had recorded their first post-war victory in Tests against Australia. The series was a personal triumph for Sutcliffe who was given a civic reception on his return home to Pudsey. He scored 734 runs in the five Tests at an average of 81.55 with 4 centuries, 2 half-centuries and a highest score of 176. In the whole tour, he scored 1,250 runs at 69.44 with 5 centuries and a highest score of 188. Patsy Hendren was the only other England batsman to score over 1,000 runs on the tour.

1925 English cricket season
Holmes and Sutcliffe scored over 4,700 runs between them in 1925 as Yorkshire won a 4th successive championship in what remains the last season, excluding wartime, in which no touring team came to England. Sutcliffe's tally was 2,308 runs at 53.67 with 7 centuries and a highest score of 235 against Middlesex at Headingley.

During 1925 and 1926, Sutcliffe's skill was a primary factor in Yorkshire having the longest unbeaten run in county cricket: i.e., 70 matches without loss until early 1927. After three defeats in 1927, Yorkshire went a further 58 games without loss until 1929.

Following the retirement of Geoffrey Wilson after the 1924 season, Yorkshire appointed yet another amateur as captain, this time Major Arthur Lupton who held the post from 1925 through 1927. Otherwise the team was unchanged apart from representative calls and Yorkshire generally sent out Sutcliffe, Holmes, Leyland, Oldroyd, Kilner, Rhodes, Robinson, Lupton, Macaulay, Dolphin and Waddington in 1925. Arthur Mitchell was still a reserve and Cyril Turner made his first-class debut.

1926 English cricket season
The first four Tests of the 1926 England v Australia series were scheduled for just three days and were all curtailed by poor weather. The final Test at The Oval was timeless to ensure a finish. It has become one of the most famous matches in cricket history, not because England regained The Ashes for the first time since 1912 but for the manner it which it was achieved as Hobbs and Sutcliffe produced their most famous partnership in treacherous batting conditions. Australia had a narrow first innings lead of 22 and, at close of play on the second day (a Monday), Hobbs and Sutcliffe had taken the England second innings score to 49–0, a lead of 27. Heavy rain fell overnight and next day, as the sun shone, the pitch soon developed into a "sticky wicket" on which it was generally assumed that England would be bowled out cheaply and so lose both the match and the series. But, in spite of the very difficult batting conditions, Hobbs and Sutcliffe put up a great defence of their wickets and gradually increased their partnership to 172 before Hobbs was out for exactly 100. Sutcliffe went on to make 161 and, in the end, England won the game comfortably, by 289 runs, and regained The Ashes.

The pitch was described by match umpire Frank Chester as "the worst sticky wicket I have ever seen". The problem facing the batsmen on the rapidly drying pitch was that the ball did not bounce in the normal way. Instead, it would seemingly bite into the pitch and then rise sharply in a most unpredictable way as it turned in the air or spun. The batsmen needed to "kill" both the rise and spin of the ball as soon as it hit the pitch, so quick reflexes and footwork were necessary to deploy the necessary defensive strokes. If the ball could not be stopped as it pitched, "it had to be followed and, if possible, left alone by the means of the last moment dropping of the wrists at which both batsmen were masters".

The tributes that have been paid to Hobbs and Sutcliffe after this partnership are extensive. Pelham Warner perhaps encapsulated them all when he wrote: "Hobbs and Sutcliffe won it for us by their incomparable batting. They did not fail us at a time of most desperate crisis. Never has English cricket known a more dauntless pair". Sutcliffe's own innings was described by Monty Noble as "a masterpiece".

In the 1926 County Championship, Yorkshire lost the title despite being unbeaten to their close rivals Lancashire by a very narrow margin. Sutcliffe was 2nd in the national batting averages behind Hobbs, scoring 2,528 runs at 66.52 with 8 centuries and a highest score of exactly 200 against Leicestershire. The Yorkshire team was mostly unchanged from 1925 except that Mitchell made more appearances and Wilf Barber made his debut.

1927 English cricket season
There was no Test cricket in England in the 1927 season, the last time this has occurred outside of the war years. New Zealand made a first-class tour and played a programme against mainly county sides but its team had not yet been granted Test status. They played Yorkshire at Park Avenue, Bradford, in July but the match was ended early by rain. Holmes carried his bat for 175 not out after Sutcliffe had been dismissed for 42 in Yorkshire's only innings.

In the 1927 County Championship, Yorkshire finished 3rd but it was another great season for both Holmes and Sutcliffe who scored over 4,500 runs and 12 centuries between them. Sutcliffe scored 2,414 runs at 56.13 with 6 centuries and a highest score of 227 for England versus The Rest. The team was still largely unchanged with Mitchell moreorless a first reserve ahead of Barber and Turner. Arthur Wood made his debut in 1927 and would succeed the retiring Dolphin next season. Another retiree was Lupton and that brought into question the Yorkshire captaincy as opinions were sought about who should succeed Lupton.

Yorkshire captaincy incident

In the autumn of 1927, the Yorkshire committee decided to appoint Sutcliffe as team captain in succession to Arthur Lupton, who had retired. He would thus have become the first professional to captain the side since 1882 but, as Wisden records, "objection was taken to this action by two different parties". There were those who supported the view that no professional should be captain; and significant opposition also came from a large number of members who argued that, if a professional were to be appointed, it should be Wilfred Rhodes rather than Sutcliffe. Sutcliffe himself was en route to South Africa while most of the furore developed and had to rely on telegrams for his news. When first advised of the appointment, he sent a reply that spoke of the great honour and his desire to serve Yorkshire and England. But he was better apprised of the controversy when he arrived in Cape Town and finally sent a message that he was declining the offer but willing to serve under any other captain.

The committee then appealed to William Worsley who agreed to "step into the breach" and he held the post through 1928 and 1929, his only two seasons in first-class cricket. The incident had little if any effect on Sutcliffe and he continued his Yorkshire career after his return from South Africa, loyally supporting Worsley and getting on with his colleagues. Like Sutcliffe, Worsley had served in the Green Howards during the war, although he did see action and was both wounded and captured.

The actions of Lord Hawke and his supporters on the committee may have been influenced by Sutcliffe's gentlemanly persona and the fact that his sportswear business in Leeds was by then well established. For example, Alan Gibson described Sutcliffe as "a gentleman (with) impeccable manners" who was "a good public speaker". The general perception was that Sutcliffe was not a typical professional cricketer, whereas Rhodes was always perceived as the archetypal professional.

Yorkshire did not appoint a professional captain in the 20th century until Vic Wilson in 1960, even though Len Hutton captained England as a professional in the 1950s while playing for Yorkshire. Alan Gibson expressed a view that Sutcliffe should have been made captain and posed an intriguing "what if?" scenario by saying that Sutcliffe might then have been appointed England captain in 1931. In that case, Sutcliffe would have led the England tour of Australia in 1932–33 instead of Douglas Jardine. Although Sutcliffe backed Jardine's deployment of the bodyline tactic, no one can say what tactics he would have adopted himself in Jardine's position. Sutcliffe said later that he regretted having to withdraw his acceptance. His son Billy, who went to a public school and was an amateur player, became Yorkshire captain in 1956.

References

Bibliography
 John Arlott, Arlott on Cricket (ed. David Rayvern Allen), Collins, 1984
 John Arlott, Portrait of the Master, Penguin, 1982
 Barclays World of Cricket, 3rd edition, (ed. E. W. Swanton), Willow Books, 1986. Article on Sutcliffe written by Ian Peebles.
 Derek Birley, A Social History of English Cricket, Aurum, 1999
 Neville Cardus, Close of Play, Sportsmans Book Club edition, 1957, "Sutcliffe and Yorkshire", pp. 1–10
 Bill Frindall, The Wisden Book of Cricket Records, Queen Anne Press, 1986, 
 Alan Gibson, The Cricket Captains of England, Cassell, 1979
 Alan Hill, Herbert Sutcliffe: Cricket Maestro, Stadia, 2007 (2nd edition)
 Douglas Jardine, In Quest of the Ashes, Methuen, 2005
 Ronald Mason, Jack Hobbs, Sportsman's Book Club, 1961
 Pelham Warner, Lords: 1787–1945, Harrap, 1946
 Pelham Warner, Cricket Between Two Wars, Sporting Handbooks, 1946
 Roy Webber, The County Cricket Championship, Sportsman's Book Club, 1958
 Simon Wilde, Number One: The World's Best Batsmen and Bowlers, Gollancz, 1998, 
 Wisden Cricketers' Almanack, various editions from 1920 to 1946
 Graeme Wright, A Wisden Collection, Wisden, 2004

External links
 

English cricket seasons in the 20th century
1919